Bugady Musun was a Siberian goddess particularly revered by the Evenki people. She was the patron of wildlife and the guardian of animals. She usually took the form of a tough older woman or a huge female elk or reindeer.

See also 
 Dali
 Deer Woman

References 

Siberian deities
Animal goddesses